Dichromodes is a genus of moths in the family Geometridae first described by Achille Guenée in 1857.

Species

 Dichromodes aesia Turner, 1930
 Dichromodes ainaria Guenée, 1857
 Dichromodes anelictis Meyrick, 1890
 Dichromodes angasi (R. Felder & Rogenhofer, 1875)
 Dichromodes aristadelpha Lower, 1903
 Dichromodes atrosignata (Walker, 1861)
 Dichromodes berthoudi Prout, 1910
 Dichromodes capnoporphyra Turner, 1939
 Dichromodes cirrhoplaca Lower, 1915
 Dichromodes compsotis Meyrick, 1890
 Dichromodes confluaria (Guenée, 1857)
 Dichromodes consignata (Walker, 1861)
 Dichromodes denticulata Turner, 1930
 Dichromodes diffusaria (Guenée, 1857)
 Dichromodes disputata (Walker, 1861)
 Dichromodes emplecta Turner, 1930
 Dichromodes estigmaria (Walker, 1861)
 Dichromodes euprepes Prout, 1910
 Dichromodes euscia Meyrick, 1890
 Dichromodes explanata (Walker, 1861)
 Dichromodes exsignata (Walker, 1861)
 Dichromodes fulvida Lower, 1915
 Dichromodes galactica Turner, 1930
 Dichromodes haematopa Turner, 1906
 Dichromodes icelodes Turner, 1930
 Dichromodes indicataria (Walker, 1866)
 Dichromodes ioneura Meyrick, 1890
 Dichromodes ischnota Meyrick, 1890
 Dichromodes lechria Turner, 1943
 Dichromodes leptogramma Turner, 1930
 Dichromodes leptozona Turner, 1930
 Dichromodes limosa Turner, 1930
 Dichromodes lissophrica Turner, 1930
 Dichromodes longidens Prout, 1910
 Dichromodes loxotropha Turner, 1943
 Dichromodes lygrodes Turner, 1930
 Dichromodes mesodonta Turner, 1930
 Dichromodes mesogonia Prout, 1910
 Dichromodes mesoporphyra Turner, 1939
 Dichromodes mesotoma Turner, 1943
 Dichromodes mesozona L.B. Prout, 1910
 Dichromodes molybdaria (Guenée, 1857)
 Dichromodes obtusata (Walker, 1861)
 Dichromodes orectis Meyrick, 1890
 Dichromodes oriphoetes Turner, 1930
 Dichromodes ornata (Walker, 1861)
 Dichromodes orthotis Meyrick, 1890
 Dichromodes orthozona Lower, 1903
 Dichromodes paratacta Meyrick, 1890
 Dichromodes partitaria (Walker, 1866)
 Dichromodes personalis (R. Felder & Rogenhofer, 1874)
 Dichromodes phaeoxesta Turner, 1939
 Dichromodes poecilotis Meyrick, 1890
 Dichromodes raynori Prout, 1920
 Dichromodes rimosa Prout, 1910
 Dichromodes rostrata Turner, 1930
 Dichromodes rufilinea Turner, 1939
 Dichromodes rufula Prout, 1910
 Dichromodes scothima Prout, 1910
 Dichromodes semicanescens Prout, 1913
 Dichromodes sigmata (Walker, 1861)
 Dichromodes stilbiata (Guenée, 1857)
 Dichromodes subrufa Turner, 1939
 Dichromodes triparata (Walker, 1861)
 Dichromodes typhistis Turner, 1939
 Dichromodes uniformis Bastelberger, 1907
 Dichromodes usurpatrix Prout, 1910

References

Oenochrominae
Geometridae genera